John Slack may refer to:

 John M. Slack Jr. (1915–1980), American politician from West Virginia
 John Bamford Slack (1857–1909), British politician
 John Slack (cricketer) (1930–2012), English cricketer and judge